"Traveller" is a song written and recorded by American singer-songwriter Chris Stapleton. It was released to radio on April 27, 2015 as his debut solo single from his debut album of the same name. "Traveller" received nominations for Best Country Song and Best Country Solo Performance at the 58th Grammy Awards, winning the latter. The song has sold 135,000 copies in the United States .

Charts

Certifications

References

External links
 

2015 songs
2015 singles
Mercury Nashville singles
Songs written by Chris Stapleton
Chris Stapleton songs
Song recordings produced by Dave Cobb